Ibogaine is a naturally occurring psychoactive substance found in plants in the family Apocynaceae such as Tabernanthe iboga, Voacanga africana, and Tabernaemontana undulata. It is a psychedelic with dissociative properties.

Preliminary research indicates that it may help counter drug addiction. However, its use has been associated with serious side effects and death. Between the years 1990 and 2008, a total of 19 fatalities temporally associated with the ingestion of ibogaine were reported, from which six subjects died of acute heart failure or cardiopulmonary arrest. The total number of subjects who have used it without major side effects during this period remains unknown. It is used as an alternative medicine treatment for drug addiction in some countries. Its prohibition in other countries has slowed scientific research. Ibogaine is also used to facilitate psychological introspection and spiritual exploration. Various derivatives of ibogaine designed to lack psychedelic properties (such as 18-MC) are under clinical trials which have shown them to be neither psychedelic nor psychoactive and to have acceptable safety profiles in humans.

The psychoactivity of the root bark of the iboga tree (Tabernanthe iboga), from which ibogaine is extracted, was first discovered by the Pygmy tribes of Central Africa, who passed the knowledge to the Bwiti tribe of Gabon. French explorers in turn learned of it from the Bwiti tribe and brought ibogaine back to Europe in 1899–1900, where it was subsequently marketed in France as a stimulant under the trade name Lambarène. Ibogaine-containing preparations are used for medicinal and ritual purposes within the African spiritual traditions of the Bwiti, who claim to have learned it from the Pygmy peoples. Although ibogaine's anti-addictive properties were first widely promoted in 1962 by Howard Lotsof, its Western medical use predates that by at least a century.

Additionally, the U.S. Central Intelligence Agency (CIA) studied the effects of ibogaine in the 1950s.

Ibogaine is an indole alkaloid that is obtained either by extraction from the iboga plant or by semi-synthesis from the precursor compound voacangine, another plant alkaloid. The total synthesis of ibogaine was described in 1956. Structural elucidation by X-ray crystallography was completed in 1960.

Psychoactive effects 

Ibogaine is derived from the root of the Tabernanthe iboga, a plant known to exhibit psychedelic effects in its users. The experience of ibogaine occurs in two phases, termed the visionary phase and the introspection phase. The visionary phase has been described as oneirogenic, referring to the dreamlike nature of its psychedelic effects, and lasts for 4 to 6 hours. The second phase, the introspection phase, is responsible for the psychotherapeutic effects. It can allow people to conquer their fears and negative emotions. Ibogaine catalyzes an altered state of consciousness reminiscent of dreaming while fully conscious and aware so that memories, life experiences, and issues of trauma can be processed.

Uses

Medical

Ibogaine is not currently approved for any medical uses. There are legal ibogaine rehabilitation facilities in Mexico and Brazil. Clinical studies of ibogaine to treat drug addiction began in the early 1990s, but concerns about cardiotoxicity led to termination of those studies. There is insufficient data to determine whether it is useful in treating addiction.

Religious
In Bwiti religious ceremonies, the root bark is pulverized and swallowed in large amounts to produce intense psychoactive effects.

Adverse effects

Immediate
One of the first noticeable effects of large-dose ibogaine ingestion is ataxia, a difficulty in coordinating muscle motion which makes standing and walking difficult without assistance. Xerostomia (dry mouth), nausea, and vomiting may follow. These symptoms may be long in duration, ranging from 4 to 24 hours in some cases. Ibogaine is sometimes administered per rectum to avoid nausea and vomiting. Ibogaine decreases body temperature.

Cardiovascular
Ibogaine causes long QT syndrome at higher doses, apparently by blocking hERG potassium channels in the heart.

Neurotoxicity
Work in the laboratory of Mark Molliver at Johns Hopkins indicated degeneration of cerebellar Purkinje cells observed in rats given substantially larger dosages of ibogaine than those used to study drug self-administration and withdrawal. However, subsequent research found no evidence of neurotoxicity in a primate or mouse at dosages that produced cerebellar degeneration in the rat, and it has been suggested that cerebellar degeneration might be a phenomenon limited to a single species. The FDA was aware of Molliver's work at the time it approved a phase-1 study in which humans received ibogaine in 1993. Neuropathological examination revealed no evidence of degenerative changes in a woman who had received four separate doses of ibogaine ranging between 10 and 30 mg⁄ kg over a 15-month interval. A published series of fatalities temporally associated with the ingestion of ibogaine found no evidence suggesting a characteristic syndrome of neurotoxicity.

Interactions 

Adverse interactions may occur between ibogaine and psychiatric medications. Some studies also suggest the possibility of adverse interaction with heart conditions.

Because ibogaine is one of the many drugs that are partly metabolized by the cytochrome P450 complex, caution must be exercised to avoid foods or drugs that interfere with these CYP450 enzymes, in particular foods containing bergamottin or bergamot oil, such as grapefruit juice.

Ibogaine is an antagonist to reserpine.

Pharmacology

Pharmacodynamics 

Ibogaine affects many different neurotransmitter systems simultaneously.

Noribogaine is most potent as a serotonin reuptake inhibitor. It acts as a moderate κ-opioid receptor agonist and weak μ-opioid receptor agonist or weak partial agonist. It is possible that the action of ibogaine at the kappa opioid receptor may indeed contribute significantly to the psychoactive effects attributed to ibogaine ingestion; Salvia divinorum, another plant recognized for its strong hallucinogenic properties, contains the chemical salvinorin A, which is a highly selective kappa opioid agonist. Noribogaine is more potent than ibogaine in rat drug discrimination assays when tested for the subjective effects of ibogaine.

Pharmacokinetics 
Ibogaine is metabolized in the human body by cytochrome P450 2D6 (CYP2D6) into noribogaine (more correctly, O-desmethylibogaine or 12-hydroxyibogamine). Both ibogaine and noribogaine have a plasma half-life of around two hours in the rat, although the half-life of noribogaine is slightly longer than that of the parent compound. It is proposed that ibogaine is deposited in fat and metabolized into noribogaine as it is released. After ibogaine ingestion in humans, noribogaine shows higher plasma levels than ibogaine and is detected for a longer period of time than ibogaine.

Chemistry

Ibogaine is a tryptamine. It has two separate chiral centers, meaning that there are four different stereoisomers of ibogaine. These four isomers are difficult to resolve.

Synthesis 
One recent total synthesis of ibogaine and related drugs starts with 2-iodo-4-methoxyaniline which is reacted with triethyl((4-(triethylsilyl)but-3-yn-1-yl)oxy)silane using palladium acetate in DMF to form 2-(triethylsilyl)-3-(2-((triethylsilyl)oxy)ethyl)-1H-indole. This is converted using N-iodosuccinamide and then fluoride to form 2-(2-iodo-1H-indol-3-yl)ethanol. This is treated with iodine, triphenyl phosphine, and imidazole to form 2-iodo-3-(2-iodoethyl)-1H-indole. Then, using 7-ethyl-2-azabicyclo[2.2.2]oct-5-ene and cesium carbonate in acetonitrile, the ibogaine precursor 7-ethyl-2-(2-(2-iodo-1H-indol-3-yl)ethyl)-2-azabicyclo[2.2.2]oct-5-ene is obtained. Using palladium acetate in DMF, the ibogaine is obtained. If the exo ethyl group on the 2-azabicyclo[2.2.2]octane system in ibogaine is replaced with an endo ethyl, then epiibogaine is formed.

Crystalline ibogaine hydrochloride is typically produced by semi-synthesis from voacangine in commercial laboratories. It can be prepared from voacangine through one-step demethoxycarbonylation process too.

Derivatives
A synthetic derivative of ibogaine, 18-methoxycoronaridine (18-MC), is a selective α3β4 antagonist that was developed collaboratively by the neurologist Stanley D. Glick (Albany) and the chemist Martin E. Kuehne (Vermont). This discovery was stimulated by earlier studies on other naturally occurring analogues of ibogaine such as coronaridine and voacangine that showed these compounds also have anti-addictive properties. More recently, non- and less- hallucinogenic analogs, tabernanthalog and ibogainalog, were engineered by scientists attempting to produce non-cardiotoxic ibogaine derivatives by removing the lipophilic isoquinuclidine ring. In animal models, both molecules failed to produce cardiac arrhythmias and tabernanthalog failed to produce any head twitch response, suggesting psychedelic effects were absent.

Natural occurrence 

Ibogaine occurs naturally in iboga root bark. Ibogaine is also available in a total alkaloid extract of the Tabernanthe iboga plant, which also contains all the other iboga alkaloids and thus has only about half the potency by weight of standardized ibogaine hydrochloride.

History 

The use of iboga in African spiritual ceremonies was first reported by French and Belgian explorers in the 19th century, beginning with the work of French naval physician and explorer of Gabon Marie-Théophile Griffon du Bellay. The first botanical description of the Tabernanthe iboga plant was made in 1889. Ibogaine was first isolated from T. iboga in 1901 by Dybowski and Landrin and independently by Haller and Heckel in the same year using T. iboga samples from Gabon. Complete synthesis of ibogaine was accomplished by G. Büchi in 1966. Since then, several other synthesis methods have been developed.

From the 1930s to 1960s, ibogaine was sold in France in the form of Lambarène, an extract of the Tabernanthe manii plant, and promoted as a mental and physical stimulant. The drug enjoyed some popularity among post-World War II athletes. Lambarène was withdrawn from the market in 1966 when the sale of ibogaine-containing products became illegal in France.

In the late 1960s, the World Health Assembly classified ibogaine as a "substance likely to cause dependency or endanger human health"; the U.S. Food and Drug Administration (FDA) assigned it Schedule I classification, and the International Olympic Committee banned it as a potential doping agent.

Anecdotal reports concerning ibogaine's effects appeared in the early 1960s. Its anti-addictive properties were discovered accidentally by Howard Lotsof in 1962, at the age of 19, when he and five friends—all heroin addicts—noted subjective reduction of their craving and withdrawal symptoms while taking it. Further anecdotal observation convinced Lotsof of its potential usefulness in treating substance addictions.  He contracted with a Belgian company to produce ibogaine in tablet form for clinical trials in the Netherlands, and was awarded a United States patent for the product in 1985.  The first objective, placebo-controlled evidence of ibogaine's ability to attenuate opioid withdrawal in rats was published by Dzoljic et al. in 1988. Diminution of morphine self-administration was reported in preclinical studies by Glick et al. in 1991.  Cappendijk et al. demonstrated reduction in cocaine self-administration in rats in 1993, and Rezvani reported reduced alcohol dependence in three strains of "alcohol-preferring" rats in 1995.

As the use of ibogaine spread, its administration varied widely; some groups administered it systematically using well-developed methods and medical personnel, while others employed haphazard and possibly dangerous methodology. Lotsof and his colleagues, committed to the traditional administration of ibogaine, developed treatment regimens themselves. In 1992, Eric Taub brought ibogaine to an offshore location close to the United States, where he began providing treatments and popularizing its use. In Costa Rica, Lex Kogan, another leading proponent, joined Taub in systematizing its administration. The two men established medically monitored treatment clinics in several countries.

In 1981, an unnamed European manufacturer produced 44 kg of iboga extract. The entire stock was purchased by Carl Waltenburg, who distributed it under the name "Indra extract" and used it in 1982 to treat heroin addicts in the community of Christiania. Indra extract was available for sale over the Internet until 2006, when the Indra web presence disappeared. Various products are currently sold in a number of countries as "Indra extract", but it is unclear if any of them are derived from Waltenburg's original stock. Ibogaine and related indole compounds are susceptible to oxidation over time.

The National Institute on Drug Abuse (NIDA) began funding clinical studies of ibogaine in the United States in the early 1990s, but terminated the project in 1995. Data demonstrating ibogaine's efficacy in attenuating opioid withdrawal in drug-dependent human subjects was published by Alper et al. in 1999. A cohort of 33 patients were treated with 6 to 29 mg/kg of ibogaine; 25 displayed resolution of the signs of opioid withdrawal from 24 hours to 72 hours post-treatment, but one 24-year-old female, who received the highest dosage, died.  Mash et al. (2000), using lower oral doses (10–12 mg/kg) in 27 patients, demonstrated significantly lower objective opiate withdrawal scores in heroin addicts 36 hours after treatment, with self-reports of decreased cocaine and opiate craving and alleviated depression symptoms.  Many of these effects appeared sustainable over a one-month post-discharge follow-up.

Society and culture

Legal status 
The Global Ibogaine Therapy Alliance publishes a map of ibogaine legal status in various countries around the world.

Treatment clinics
Ibogaine treatment clinics have emerged in Mexico, Canada, the Netherlands, South Africa, and New Zealand, all operating in what has been described as a "legal gray area". Costa Rica also has treatment centers. Covert, illegal neighborhood clinics are known to exist in the United States, despite active DEA surveillance.  While clinical guidelines for ibogaine-assisted detoxification were released by the Global Ibogaine Therapy Alliance in 2015, addiction specialists warn that the treatment of drug dependence with ibogaine in non-medical settings, without expert supervision and unaccompanied by appropriate psychosocial care, can be dangerous — and, in approximately one case in 300, potentially fatal.

Media

Documentary films 
Detox or Die (2004)
Directed by David Graham Scott. David Graham Scott begins videotaping his heroin-addicted friends. Before long, he himself is addicted to the drug. He eventually turns the camera on himself and his family. After 12 years of debilitating, painful dependence on methadone, Scott turns to ibogaine. Filmed in Scotland and England, and broadcast on BBC One as the third installment in the documentary series One Life.
Ibogaine: Rite of Passage (2004)
Directed by Ben Deloenen. Cy, a 34-year-old heroin addict, undergoes ibogaine treatment with Dr. Martin Polanco at the Ibogaine Association, a clinic in Rosarito, Mexico. Deloenen interviews people formerly addicted to heroin, cocaine, and methamphetamine, who share their perspectives about ibogaine treatment. In Gabon, a Babongo woman receives iboga root for her depressive malaise. Deloenen visually contrasts this Western, clinical use of ibogaine with the Bwiti use of iboga root, but emphasizes the Western context.
Facing the Habit (2007)
Directed by Magnolia Martin. Martin's subject is a former millionaire and stockbroker who travels to Mexico for ibogaine treatment for heroin addiction.
Tripping in Amsterdam (2008)
In this short film directed by Jan Bednarz, Simon "Swany" Wan visits Sara Glatt's iboga treatment center in Amsterdam. Current TV broadcast the documentary in 2008 as part of their "Quarter-life Crisis" programming roster.
I'm Dangerous with Love (2009)
Directed by Michel Negroponte. Negroponte examines Dimitri Mobengo Mugianis's long, clandestine career of treating heroin addicts with ibogaine.
"Hallucinogens" (2012)
In one of five segments from this episode of Drugs, Inc. on National Geographic Channel, a former heroin user treats addicts with ibogaine  in Canada. He himself used ibogaine to stop his abuse of narcotics.
"Addiction" (2013)
This episode of the HBO documentary series Vice devotes a segment to the use of ibogaine to interrupt heroin addiction.
The Ibogaine Safari (2014)
A documentary by filmmaker Pierre le Roux which investigates the claims of painless withdrawal from opiates such as nyaope/heroin in South Africa by taking several addicts on an adventure "safari" while taking ibogaine. The documentary won the award for 'Best Documentary Short' at the 2014 Canada International Film Festival.
Iboga Nights (2014)

 Directed by David Graham Scott.

Dosed (2019)
A documentary by Tyler Chandler and Nicholas Meyers. Synopsis- After many years of prescription medications failed her a suicidal woman turns to underground healers to try and overcome her depression, anxiety, and opioid addiction with illegal psychedelic medicine like magic mushrooms and iboga. Adrianne’s first dose of psilocybin mushrooms catapulted her into an unexpected world of healing where plant medicines are redefining our understanding of mental health and addiction.

"Synthetic Ibogaine - Natural Tramadol" (2021)
This episode of the documentary series Hamilton's Pharmacopeia on Vice on TV, follows a struggling local addict to a Ibogaine ritual.

"Lamar Odom Reborn" (2022)
A documentary by Mike "Zappy" Zapolin that features the NBA player and Meeting the Kardashians star Lamar Odom as he seeks out ibogaine and other therapies to heal PTSD, anxiety, and addiction.

Print media 
While in Wisconsin covering the primary campaign for the United States presidential election of 1972, gonzo journalist Hunter S. Thompson submitted a satirical article to Rolling Stone accusing Democratic Party candidate Edmund Muskie of being addicted to ibogaine.  Many readers, and even other journalists, did not realize that the Rolling Stone piece was facetious.  The ibogaine assertion, which was completely unfounded, did significant damage to Muskie's reputation, and was cited as a factor in his loss of the nomination to George McGovern.  Thompson later said he was surprised that anyone believed it.  The article is included in Thompson's post-election anthology, Fear and Loathing on the Campaign Trail '72 (1973).

Author and Yippie Dana Beal co-wrote the 1997 book The Ibogaine Story.

American author Daniel Pinchbeck wrote about his own experience of ibogaine in his book Breaking Open the Head (2002), and in a 2003 article for The Guardian titled "Ten years of therapy in one night".

Television drama 
Ibogaine factors into the stories of these episodes from television drama series:

Radio 
  — A former heroin addict realizes that he wants to help other addicts kick their habits. The problem is, he wants to do this using a hallucinogenic drug - ibogaine - that is completely illegal, and which requires medical expertise he doesn't have.

Research

Addiction treatment 
The most-studied therapeutic effect of ibogaine is the reduction or elimination of addiction to opioids. An integral effect is the alleviation of symptoms of opioid withdrawal. Research also suggests that ibogaine may be useful in treating dependence on other substances such as alcohol, methamphetamine, and nicotine, and may affect compulsive behavioral patterns not involving substance abuse or chemical dependence. Researchers note that there remains a "need for systematic investigation in a conventional clinical research setting."

Many users of ibogaine report experiencing visual phenomena during a waking dream state, such as instructive replays of life events that led to their addiction, while others report therapeutic shamanic visions that help them conquer the fears and negative emotions that might drive their addiction. It is proposed that intensive counseling, therapy, and aftercare during the interruption period following treatment is of significant value. Some individuals require a second or third treatment session with ibogaine over the course of 12 to 18 months. A minority of individuals relapse completely into opiate addiction within days or weeks. A comprehensive article (Lotsof 1995) on the subject of ibogaine therapy detailing the procedure, effects, and aftereffects is found in "Ibogaine in the Treatment of Chemical Dependence Disorders: Clinical Perspectives". Ibogaine has also been reported in multiple small-study cohorts to reduce cravings for methamphetamine.

There is also evidence that this type of treatment works with LSD, which has been shown to have a therapeutic effect on alcoholism. Both ibogaine and LSD appear to be effective for encouraging introspection and giving the user occasion to reflect on the sources of their addiction, while also producing an intense, transformative experience that can put established patterns of behavior into perspective; ibogaine has the added benefit of preventing withdrawal effects.

Chronic pain management 
In 1957, Jurg Schneider, a pharmacologist at CIBA (now a division of Novartis), found that ibogaine potentiated morphine analgesia. No additional data was ever published by CIBA researchers on ibogaine–opioid interactions. Almost 50 years later, Patrick Kroupa and Hattie Wells released the first treatment protocol for concomitant administration of ibogaine with opioids in human subjects, indicating that ibogaine reduced tolerance to opioid drugs. Their paper in the Multidisciplinary Association for Psychedelic Studies journal demonstrated that administration of low "maintenance" doses of ibogaine HCl with opioids decreases tolerance, but noted that ibogaine's potentiating action could make this a risky procedure.

Psychotherapy 
Ibogaine has been used as an adjunct to psychotherapy by Claudio Naranjo, documented in his book The Healing Journey. He was awarded patent  in 1974.

Treatment of Brain Injuries 
Some investigation is being done into the use of psychedelic substances, including Ibogaine, for the treatment of Traumatic brain injury

See also 
 Coronaridine
 Ibogaline
 Ibogamine
 Pinoline
 Tabernanthine
 Voacangine

References 

Alkaloids found in Apocynaceae
Alkaloids found in Iboga
Dream
Drug rehabilitation
Entheogens
HERG blocker
Indole alkaloids
Nicotinic antagonists
NMDA receptor antagonists
Oneirogens
Phenol ethers
Plant toxins
Serotonin receptor agonists
Sigma agonists
Tryptamines
VMAT inhibitors